Denderhoutem is a village, located in the Denderstreek in the Flemish province of East Flanders (Belgium). Since 1977 it is part of the municipality of Haaltert.

The arms show a garb, most likely a symbol for agriculture.
The old seals of the local council, dating from the 15th and 16th century, showed a tree, with on the sides two small shields, one with the lion of Flanders, the other with the arms of Burgundy. Why the council in the early 19th century applied for the garb instead is not known.

Residents

Mr. Johannes Josef van de Velde was a third class passenger on the RMS Titanic in 1912, his last place of residence is listed as Denderhoutem. Mr. van de Velde did not survive the sinking and his body was not recovered. He left behind a wife, four children and siblings.

Between 1880s and WW1 perhaps 500 emigrants left Denderhautem and area, located south of Aalst in East Flanders. The main areas of settlement were Detroit, southwest Ontario, California and British Columbia. One source of information on them is:
Denerdhautem naar Amerika

Events
Boerenmarkt
Driekoningen (first Saturday of the year)
Grote Kermis (first Sunday of September)
Jaarmarkt
Kleine Kermis (2 weeks after Easter)
Mini-Rock
Stopselquiz
Trotinettenkoers
Zonnestraatfeesten

References

External links (in Dutch)
AtomTV
Radio PROS (local radiostation)

Haaltert
Populated places in East Flanders